Hulbækmo is a surname. Notable people with the surname include:

Alf Hulbækmo (born 1992), Norwegian musician and composer
Hans Hulbækmo (born 1989), Norwegian musician and composer
Tone Hulbækmo (born 1957), Norwegian singer and musician

Norwegian-language surnames